Nadirs is a collection of largely autobiographical short stories by Romanian-German writer and Nobel laureate Herta Müller. The stories center on life in the Romanian countryside.

The book was first released in Romania in 1982, where it received a prize awarded by the Central Committee of the Union of Communist Youth. A supposedly uncensored version, missing four chapters of the Romanian version, was smuggled to Germany and released in 1984.

Stories

 The Funeral Sermon
 The Swabian Bath
 My Family
 Nadirs
 Rotten Pears
 Oppressive Tango
 The Window
 The Man with the Matchbox
 Village Chronicle
 About German Mustaches and Hair Parts
 The Intervillage Bus
 Mother, Father, and the Little One
 The Street Sweepers
 Black Park
 Workday

References

1982 short story collections
Works by Herta Müller
Romanian short stories